Senožeti is a settlement west of Šentlambert in the Municipality of Zagorje ob Savi in central Slovenia. The area is part of the traditional region of Upper Carniola. It is now included with the rest of the municipality in the Central Sava Statistical Region.

The local church, built south of the settlement core, is dedicated to the Holy Spirit and belongs to the Parish of Šentlambert. It dates to the late 17th century.

References

External links
Senožeti on Geopedia

Populated places in the Municipality of Zagorje ob Savi